Demitz-Thumitz (German) or Zemicy-Tumicy (Upper Sorbian) is a municipality in the east of Saxony, Germany. It belongs to the district of Bautzen.

Geography 
The municipality is situated at the edge of the Lausitzer Bergland (Lusatian Hills).

Villages 
The following villages belong to the municipality (names given in German/Upper Sorbian):

Demitz-Thumitz/Zemicy-Tumicy
Wölkau/Wjelkowy
Medewitz/Mjedźojz
Birkenrode/Brězyšćo
Rothnaußlitz/
Cannewitz/Chanecy
Karlsdorf/
Pottschapplitz/Počaplicy
Pohla-Stacha/Palow-Stachow

History
Within the German Empire (1871-1918), Demitz-Thumitz was part of the Kingdom of Saxony.

Transport 
Demitz-Thumitz is located at the railroad line Dresden-Görlitz and the Bundesstraße 6 (Dresden-Bautzen).

References 

Populated places in Bautzen (district)